Zubeida Habib Rahimtoola (12 August 1917 – 5 July 2015), born Zubeida Sultan Chinoy in Bombay was an Activist and Social Worker primarily based out of Karachi. She was the president of All-India Muslim League in UK and founding member of All Pakistan Women's Association. She was awarded with Sitara-e-Khidmat (Star of Service) for her services by the President Ayub Khan.

Personal life
Zubeida Chinoy married Habib Rahimtoola in 1935. From that point on she took on an active social welfare front to support Muslim women in British India followed by several women development projects mainly revolving around education after creation of Pakistan.

On the family front, Zubaida Rahimtoola's father Sultan Chinoy was a businessman and had remained Mayor of Bombay [1938-39]. She had three children from her marriage to Habib Ibrahim Rahimtoola i.e. two sons and a daughter.

Early life and career
She received her early education at Convent of Jesus and Mary, Bombay (present-day Mumbai) followed by matriculation at the Queen Mary's School. She then attended Elphinstone College where she obtained her Bachelor of Arts degree.

Zubeida Rahimtoola was one of the founding members of the All Pakistan Women's Association (APWA). As she was based in the United Kingdom at partition in 1947, she became the first President of APWA UK. She was the first President of the Jinnah's All-India Muslim League in the United Kingdom after the independence of Pakistan in 1947.

She returned to Pakistan in 1953 and continued her work with APWA. She led various delegations of the organization to Afro-Asia Conferences and China. Zubeida was the President of the Sindh APWA (1953–54) – then she became Vice President APWA National (1955–58). She also held the position of Chairman APWA Cottage Industry (1956–74). Finally she was the Chairman, Karachi APWA (1991–97). She also held the position of Secretary's at the Pakistan American Cultural Center in Karachi.

Awards
Begum Rahimtoola was awarded the Sitara-e-Khidmat (Star of Service) by the President of Pakistan Ayub Khan in 1960 for her contributions to women's organizations in Pakistan and her work on 'West Pakistan Family Laws' including Women's Rights.

Death
Zubeida Habib Rahimtoola died on 5 July 2015 at age 97 at Karachi, Pakistan.

References

Pakistani women
Politicians from Mumbai
1917 births
2015 deaths
Elphinstone College alumni
Pakistani expatriates in England
All India Muslim League members
Pakistani people of Gujarati descent
Pakistani social workers
Pakistani women's rights activists
Politicians from Karachi
Indian Ismailis
Pakistani Ismailis